Bruce and Clairton Railroad was a railroad in Pennsylvania, running from Bruce, Pennsylvania to Clairton, Pennsylvania on the Monongahela River.  In 1902, it merged with the West Side Belt Railroad, before it had finished its construction.

References